The X Factor is an American television singing talent show. It was broadcast annually from 2011 until 2013. The winners and finalists of the seasons have seen varied levels of success with musical releases.

Singles

Albums

References

Music releases
X Factor